Cable is an unincorporated community and census-designated place in Richland Grove Township, Mercer County, Illinois, United States. It is located south of Sherrard. As of the 2020 census, it had a population of 117.

Geography
Cable is located in northeastern Mercer County at  (41.28306, −90.50722), on the east side of the valley of Camp Creek, a south-flowing tributary of the Edwards River.

Demographics

Notable people
Baby Doll Jacobson, MLB outfielder for the Detroit Tigers, St. Louis Browns, Boston Red Sox, Cleveland Indians, and Philadelphia Athletics
Luke Nelson, MLB pitcher for the New York Yankees

References

Census-designated places in Mercer County, Illinois
Census-designated places in Illinois
Unincorporated communities in Mercer County, Illinois
Unincorporated communities in Illinois